Hellinsia conjunctus is a moth of the family Pterophoridae. It is found in Colombia.

The wingspan is 17 mm. The forewings are grey‑brown and the markings are brown. The hindwings are brown‑grey and the fringes grey‑brown.

References

Moths described in 1877
conjunctus
Moths of South America